Pritykinskaya is a rural locality (a village) in Pezhemskoye Rural Settlement of Velsky District, Arkhangelsk Oblast, Russia. The population was 146 as of 2014. There are 4 streets.

Geography 
Pritykinskaya is located 27 km southwest of Velsk (the district's administrative centre) by road. Fedkovo is the nearest rural locality.

References 

Rural localities in Velsky District